Glipa oshimana is a species of beetle in the genus Glipa. It was described in 1966.

References

oshimana
Beetles described in 1966